Dogtown Reservoir is located near Williams in North Central Arizona, United States. Recreational facilities at the reservoir are maintained under the authority of the Kaibab National Forest.

Fish species

 Rainbow Trout
 Brown Trout
 Largemouth Bass
 Crappie
 Sunfish
 Catfish (Channel)

References

External links
 Arizona Boating Locations Facilities Map
 Arizona Fishing Locations Map
 Video of Dogtown Reservoir

Reservoirs in Coconino County, Arizona
Kaibab National Forest
Reservoirs in Arizona